Dulhan Hum Le Jayenge is a 2000 Indian Hindi-language romantic comedy film directed by David Dhawan, starring Salman Khan and Karisma Kapoor. The film was one of the top-grossing commercially successful films of 2000

Plot
Sapna (Karisma Kapoor) has been brought up by her three doting, but eccentric uncles. Prabhu (Paresh Rawal) is a very religious Hindu, while Bhola (Om Puri) is a former wrestler who is very into fitness and makes Sapna do intense workout routines daily. Vicky (Anupam Kher) is into fashion and western music. The uncles all wish for her to marry, but their differences clash, as each of them wants the boy to have the same interests as them. Sapna is tired of dancing to her uncle's tunes all her life and wishes to take a group trip to Europe. However, when she expresses her wishes to her nanny, Mary (Himani Shivpuri), her uncles fire the nanny for giving Sapna such foolish ideas. However, Mary works for another family and tells them of Sapna's plight. She shares Sapna's photo with Raja (Salman Khan), who is now determined to make her his bride. Meanwhile, Sapna looks to the last resort and tries to run away, but Vicky catches her and volunteers to take her to the airport himself. On her travels through Europe, Raja creates nothing but trouble for her, but circumstances separate them from the rest of the tour group, and Raja saves Sapna's life. They fall in love and wish to marry once they return to India, but Raja must first impress all three of her uncles. Through a series of comic events, Raja wins their hearts. He and Sapna happily marry in the end.

Cast 
Salman Khan as Raja Oberoi 
Karisma Kapoor as Sapna
Kader Khan as Mr. Oberoi  
Satish Kaushik as Laughing Police Inspector  
Johnny Lever as Tour Manager Chirkund/Chirkunda
Om Puri as Bhola Nath 
Paresh Rawal as Prabhu Nath 
Anupam Kher as Vicky Nath 
Deepak Tijori as Smuggler
Kashmera Shah as Lovely 
Farida Jalal as Mrs. Oberoi 
Himani Shivpuri as Mary  
Dara Singh as Sapna's grandfather
Rakesh Bedi as Secretary / Photographer
Usha Bachani as Smuggler's girlfriend
Mayur Verma as Rahul (Raja's Friend)

Soundtrack

The music for Dulhan Hum Le Jayenge was composed by Himesh Reshammiya (in his first full-length Bollywood album) with lyrics written by Sudhakar Sharma. It was released on Tips Music. According to the Indian trade website Box Office India, with around 18,00,000 units sold, this film's soundtrack album was the year's eighth highest-selling.

References

External links

2000 films
2000 romantic comedy films
2000s Hindi-language films
Indian romantic comedy films
Films about Indian weddings
Films directed by David Dhawan
Films scored by Himesh Reshammiya
Films scored by Surinder Sodhi
Films distributed by Yash Raj Films